The 2012 Slovnaft Cup Final will be the final match of the 2011–12 Slovak Cup, the 43rd season of the top cup competition in Slovak football. The match was played at the Mestský štadión Bardejov in Bardejov on 8 May 2012 between FK Senica and MŠK Žilina. MŠK Žilina won after the match ended 3–2 after extra time.

Road to the final

Match

Details

References

Slovak Cup Finals
Slovak Cup
Slovak Cup
Cup Final